Dill City is a town in Washita County, Oklahoma, United States. The population was 562 at the 2010 census.

Geography
Dill City is located at  (35.279470, -99.130447).

Dill City is served by State Highway 42, a dedicated spur-like state highway connecting the community to State Highway 152.

Demographics

As of the census of 2000, there were 526 people, 209 households, and 161 families residing in the town. There were 253 housing units at an average density of 456.8 per square mile (177.6/km2). The racial makeup of the town was 91.83% White, 4.37% Native American, 0.57% from other races, and 3.23% from two or more races. Hispanic or Latino of any race were 4.37% of the population.

There were 209 households, out of which 31.6% had children under the age of 18 living with them, 63.2% were married couples living together, 10.0% had a female householder with no husband present, and 22.5% were non-families. 21.5% of all households were made up of individuals, and 12.0% had someone living alone who was 65 years of age or older. The average household size was 2.52 and the average family size was 2.91.

In the town, the population was spread out, with 25.5% under the age of 18, 7.4% from 18 to 24, 24.7% from 25 to 44, 18.3% from 45 to 64, and 24.1% who were 65 years of age or older. The median age was 40 years. For every 100 females, there were 97.7 males. For every 100 females age 18 and over, there were 95.0 males.

The median income for a household in the town was $22,917, and the median income for a family was $26,500. Males had a median income of $23,125 versus $14,545 for females. The per capita income for the town was $11,558. About 17.1% of families and 21.1% of the population were below the poverty line, including 30.6% of those under age 18 and 9.7% of those age 65 or over.

Notable person
 Lester Levern Merrifield

References

External links
 Encyclopedia of Oklahoma History and Culture - Dill City

Towns in Oklahoma
Towns in Washita County, Oklahoma